Lucas Janszoon Waghenaer (–) was a Dutch cartographer and a notable figure of the Golden Age of Netherlandish cartography, known for his pioneering contributions on the subject of nautical cartography.

Career

Seafaring 
Waghenaer is one of the founding fathers and most famous members of the North Holland school, which played a major role in the early development of Dutch nautical chart-making. Between 1550 and 1579, Waghenaer sailed the seas as a chief officer. During these years he must have been in contact with Portuguese, Spanish, and Italian seafarers.

The knowledge of maritime charts and sailing instructions Waghenaer gained from these contacts were of great influence on his later work. After his seafaring career he worked in the port of Enkhuizen, as collector of maritime dues.

Cartography 

His first publication, Spieghel der zeevaerdt ("Mariner's mirror"), appeared in 1584. This chart-book combined an atlas of nautical charts and sailing directions with instructions for navigation on the western and north-western coastal waters of Europe.

It was the first of its kind in the history of nautical cartography, and was an immediate success. A second part was published the next year and was reprinted several times, and translated into English, German, Latin, and French.

In 1592, his second pilot book, Thresoor der zeevaert ("Treasure of navigation"), was published. His third and last publication, Enchuyser zeecaertboeck ("Enkhuizen sea-chart-book"), was released in 1598.

Death 
Waghenaer died around 1606, in Enkhuizen and in apparent poverty, moving the municipal authorities to extend his pension a year longer for his widow.

References

Footnotes

Bibliography

External links 

 
 
 
 
 

16th-century Dutch people
17th-century Dutch cartographers
1530s births
1600s deaths
People from Enkhuizen
Year of birth uncertain
Year of death uncertain